Echelon Corporation was an American company which designed control networks to connect machines and other electronic devices, for the purposes of sensing, monitoring and control. Echelon is now owned by Adesto Technologies.

History 
Echelon was founded in February 1988 in Palo Alto, California by Clifford "Mike" Markkula Jr. The chief executive was M. Kenneth Oshman.
Echelon's LonWorks platform for control networking was released in 1990 for use in the building, industrial, transportation, and home automation markets. At their initial public offering on March 31, 1998, their shares were listed on the NASDAQ exchange with the symbol ELON.

Started in 2003, Echelon's Networked Energy Services system was an open metering service. Echelon provides the underlying network technology for the world's largest Advanced Metering Infrastructure (AMI) in Italy with over 27 million connected electricity meters.
Based on the experiences with this installation, Echelon developed the NES (Networked Energy Services) System (including smart meters, data concentrators and a head-end data collection system) in October 2014 with about 3.5 million devices installed.

In August 2014, after quarterly revenues dropped from $24.8 million to $15 million, Echelon announced it was leaving the smart-grid business, shifting its entire corporate focus to the Internet of things as a market for its technology.  Echelon committed to only support existing customers, but not grow the grid business, and to potentially seek the sale of its grid business.

Echelon is based in Santa Clara, California, with international offices in China, France, Germany, Italy, Hong Kong, Japan, Korea, The Netherlands, and the United Kingdom.

On June 29, 2018, Adesto Technologies announced its intention to acquire Echelon for $45 million. The acquisition completed on September 14, 2018.

References

External links
About Echelon Corporation
LonMark International

Networking companies of the United States
Computer companies established in 1988
1988 establishments in California
Companies formerly listed on the Nasdaq
Companies based in San Jose, California
Companies based in Santa Clara, California
Technology companies based in the San Francisco Bay Area
Power-line communication Internet access
1998 initial public offerings
2018 mergers and acquisitions